Jacques Dutronc is the second studio album by the French singer-songwriter Jacques Dutronc, released in 1968. Since Dutronc's first seven albums are all self-titled, the album is commonly referred to by the title Il est cinq heures, after one of its singles. It is also sometimes referred to as Comment elles dorment, after its opening track. Jean-Marie Périer was credited for the front cover photography.

The single "Il est cinq heures, Paris s'éveille" was number one on the French charts for one week, from 23 March 1968.

Covers
Garage rock band Black Lips covered "Hippie Hippie Hourrah" on their third LP, Let It Bloom, released in 2005.

Track listing 
Words by Jacques Lanzmann and Anne Ségalen. Music by Jacques Dutronc.

References

1968 albums
Jacques Dutronc albums